Ḥafṣah bint ʿUmar (605–665), was the fourth wife of Muhammad and daughter of ʿUmar ibn al-Khaṭṭāb, the second caliph of Islam. In Islamic writings, her name is thus often prefixed by the title "Mother of the Believers" (Arabic: أمّ المؤمنين, romanized: ʾumm al-muʾminīn).

Early life 
Hafsa was the daughter and eldest child of 'Umar ibn al-Khattab and Zaynab bint Maz'un. She was born "when Quraysh were building the House Kaʿbah, five years before the Prophet was sent," i.e., in 605.

Marriage 
She was married to Khunays ibn Hudhafa but became a widow in August 624.

As soon as Hafsa had completed her waiting period, her father Umar offered her hand to Uthman ibn 'Affan, and thereafter to Abu Bakr; but they both refused her. When Umar went to Muhammad to complain about this, Muhammad replied, "Hafsa will marry one better than Uthman and Uthman will marry one better than Hafsa."

Muhammad married Hafsa in Sha'ban AH 3 (late January or early February 625). This marriage "gave the Prophet the chance of allying himself with this faithful follower," i.e., Umar, who now became his father-in-law.

Notable work 
Uthman, when he became Caliph, used Hafsa's copy when he standardized the text of
Qur'an. She is also said to have narrated sixty hadiths from Muhammad.

Death 
She died in Sha'ban AH 45, i.e., in October or November 665.  She is buried in Al-Baqi Cemetery next to the other Mothers of the Faithful.

Contrasting Views

Sunni View
Hafsa is seen as scholarly and inquisitive by the Sunnis. She is also respected as a Mother of The Believers.

Shi'a View
Due to certain actions of disobedience to the Prophet, Shi'as have a negative view of Hafsa.

See also
Companions of the Prophet

References

Umar
605 births
660s deaths
7th-century Arabs
Family of Muhammad
Wives of Muhammad
Banu Adi
Muslim female saints
Arab Muslims
7th-century Muslims
Children of Rashidun caliphs
Burials at Jannat al-Baqī